Dimitrios Christopoulos, also transliterated as Khristopoulos, was a Greek athlete.  He competed at the 1896 Summer Olympics in Athens.

Christopoulos was one of 17 athletes to start the marathon race.  He was one of the seven runners that dropped out of the race.

References

External links

Greek male marathon runners
Greek male long-distance runners
Olympic athletes of Greece
Athletes (track and field) at the 1896 Summer Olympics
19th-century sportsmen
Year of death missing
Year of birth missing
Place of birth missing
Place of death missing
Athletes from Patras